The New South Wales Minister for Energy is a minister in the New South Wales Government with responsibilities for matters relating to resources, energy, and utilities. The current minister, since 2 April 2019, is Matt Kean. The minister manages the portfolio through the Planning and Environment cluster.

Ultimately the ministers are responsible to the Parliament of New South Wales.

List of ministers

Energy 
The following individuals have served as the Minister for Energy, or any precedent titles:

Former ministerial titles

Mines or Resources

See also 

 List of New South Wales government agencies
 Minister for the Environment and Water (Australia)
 Minister for the Environment (Victoria)
 Minister for Environment (Western Australia)
 Minister for Environment and Natural Resources (Northern Territory)

References

External links
 NSW Department of Industry, Skills and Regional Development (NSW Department of Industry)

Energy and Environment
Energy ministers